The 470th Tactical Fighter Squadron is an inactive  United States Air Force unit.  It was last assigned to the 506th Tactical Fighter Wing, based at Tinker Air Force Base, Oklaholma. It was inactivated on 1 April 1959.

History
Established in 1957 as an F-100 Super Sabre training unit for the 506th Fighter Day Wing.   It was inactivated on 1 April 1959 due to budget constraints.

Lineage
 Established as: 470th Fighter-Day Squadron on 25 September 1957
 Re-designated: 470th Fighter-Bomber Squadron on 1 January 1958
 Re-designated: 470th Tactical Fighter Squadron on 1 July 1958
 Inactivated on 1 April 1959

Assignments
 506th Tactical Fighter Wing (various designations), 25 September 1957 – 1 April 1959

Stations
 Tinker AFB, Oklahoma, 25 September 1957 – 1 April 1959

Aircraft
 F-100 Super Sabre, 1957–1959

References

External links 

Military units and formations established in 1942
Fighter squadrons of the United States Air Force